Nathan David Miller (born 1986) is an American soccer coach who is currently the head coach of USL Championship side San Diego Loyal SC.

Playing career
Miller played for Mechanicsburg Area Senior High School in Mechanicsburg, Pennsylvania. He then attended Taylor University in Upland, Indiana, where he was a four-year starting midfielder from 2004–2008.  He was selected to the Mid-Central College Conference (MCC) All-Conference team in 2005 and 2006 and to the All-Region team in 2007. Miller served as captain of the Trojan soccer team his senior year. After college, Miller played central midfield for the Vikings AA semi-professional soccer league in Chicago, IL.

Coaching career

Amateur and College 
Miller began his coaching career as an assistant at Taylor University. He is credited with turning around Taylor University's soccer program from 14–23–1 in the two years prior to his arrival, to a three year record of 40–19–2, including 2011's season where the Trojans were 19–2–1 and ranked 17th in the NAIA.

Miller served as head coach of the Spring Arbor University men's soccer team from 2013–2018. He also served as the head coach and general manager for Lansing United, a former member of the Premier Development League now known as USL League Two, from 2015–2018. Under Miller, in 2018, Spring Arbor had one of the best seasons in program history leading to Miller becoming the conference coach of the year. Miller's record with Lansing United was 20–13–12.

Professional 
In November 2018, he was named head coach of USL League One expansion side Lansing Ignite FC. Miller led the side to a 2nd place regular season finish in USL League One, however, the team lost in the playoff semi-finals to Greenville Triumph SC. In total, Miller led Lansing to 13–8–10 season, with a 42% win percentage. On January 8, 2020, it was announced that Miller would join Landon Donovan's staff as associate head coach with San Diego Loyal in preparation for the team's inaugural season in the USL Championship.

Miller has promoted to head coach on December 2, 2022.

Personal life 
Miller was born in Jerusalem. At the age of 7, he moved with his family to Kenya. At the age of 13, he moved to Mechanicsburg, Pennsylvania. He has been married to his wife Darcy Miller since 2009. They live with their three children in San Diego, CA.

References

1986 births
Living people
American soccer coaches
Lansing Ignite FC
USL League One coaches
San Diego Loyal SC coaches
Spring Arbor Cougars men's soccer coaches
Taylor Trojans men's soccer coaches
Soccer players from Pennsylvania
People from Mechanicsburg, Pennsylvania
Association football midfielders
USL Championship coaches
Taylor Trojans men's soccer players
National Premier Soccer League coaches
Association football players not categorized by nationality